Temwa is a registered UK charity. Operating in Malawi, central Africa, Temwa works mainly in one region known as Usisya on a number of different community driven projects including Education, Health, Skills Development and Agriculture.

Short history

Temwa dates back to 2003 when it was founded by two Bristol girls, Jo Hook and Sophie Elson. The idea was initially conceived three years before while Jo and Sophie were working in Malawi. After three years of fund raising they returned to Malawi and started to build a community center.

Current projects

Education and Schools are one of the areas Temwa continue to work in, providing library services and schools support throughout the region of Usisya 

Health Education projects run by Temwa include AIDS Action Clubs and mobile HIV/AIDS testing clinics as well as awareness raising through mobile video shows. Temwa has established HIV & AIDS Action Clubs (AACs) in all 32 primary schools and 6 secondary schools in the Nkhata Bay North region. These provide health education, income-generating activities for orphans and vulnerable children, sport/gaming activities, advocacy and support for youth. Mobile video shows are also run regularly to educate the children. The objective of AACs is to help adolescents prepare to take responsibility for their own sexual and reproductive health in the fight against HIV & AIDS.  HIV/AIDs awareness group Purple Field productions worked with Temwa  on a project to raise AIDs awareness throughout the region through film.HIV/AIDs awareness group Purple Field productions worked with Temwa  on a project to raise AIDs awareness throughout the region.

Agriculture is encouraged through a range of projects, including a demonstration garden  and an ongoing project with the International Tree Foundation to plant many fruit and other trees throughout the region.

Fundraising

Temwa has a strong association with the Bristol music scene and gigs  by many local bands including Babyhead and The Zen Hussies  along with club nights  have all helped raise funds for this charity.

Temwa also has raised money through corporate sponsors Commercial Vehicle Solutions  and the fashionable fundraisers Bottle Top.

References

Charities based in Bristol
Education in Malawi
Foreign charities operating in Malawi